Scoliacma adriani is a moth in the family Erebidae. It was described by Rob de Vos in 2008. It is found in Papua, Indonesia, where it has been recorded from the area south of the Cenderawasih Bay.

References

Moths described in 2008
Lithosiina